The men's 60 metres hurdles event  at the 1997 IAAF World Indoor Championships was held on March 8–9.

Doping disqualification
Jonathan N'Senga of Belgium originally qualified for the final and finished 6th, but was later disqualified for doping.

Medalists

Results

Heats
The first 2 of each heat (Q) and next 2 fastest (q) qualified for the semifinals.

Semifinals
First 3 of each semifinal (Q) qualified directly for the final.

Final

References

Hurdles
60 metres hurdles at the World Athletics Indoor Championships